The 2010 African Fencing Championships were held in Tunis, Tunisia from 25 to 30 September.

Medal summary

Men's events

Women's events

Medal table

References

2014
African Fencing Championships
International fencing competitions hosted by Egypt
2014 in Egyptian sport